Refresh FM is a Christian radio station which broadcasts in South and Central Manchester under a Restricted Service Licence. The station is run by a steering group of volunteers although the original broadcasts were based at Victoria Park Christian Fellowship an evangelical church in Manchester.

The radio station has broadcast almost every year at Easter time from 2003; the latest broadcast was in April 2013.

The aim of Refresh FM is "to bring high quality Christian radio to Manchester" and to "bring the message of Jesus to each and every person in Manchester and beyond, using the medium of radio" http://refreshfm.org.uk/our-vision/

It is entirely staffed by volunteers from churches across Manchester and broadcasts a range of programmes including music, interviews, discussions, real-life stories and Bible devotions.

2013 

The station moved out of Victoria Park Fellowship's building due to refurbishment in 2013. A new studio was constructed and the station adopted the free radio software Rivendell. During the 28-day broadcast Refresh FM decided to continue online and now broadcasts repeats of programmes and a mix of music.

Controversy 
An article about Refresh FM was published on the gay news site Pink News in September 2009 after it allegedly sacked one of its voluntary DJs because he was gay. There was a debate about whether this situation was covered by the UK's anti-discrimination laws because it covered a man who was unpaid and did not have a contract of employment.

References

External links
 Refresh FM website

Radio stations established in 2003
Radio stations in Manchester
Christian radio stations in the United Kingdom